Alexandru Constantin Benga (born 15 June 1989) is a Romanian professional footballer who plays as a defender for Liga I club UTA Arad, which he captains.

Career
Benga joined Botev Plovdiv on 18 January 2014.

On 22 July 2014, Benga signed a one-year contract with Gabala of the Azerbaijan Premier League. In December of the same year, following the appointment of Roman Hryhorchuk, Benga was told he was no longer required by the club, and continued to train in Gabala on his own instead of terminating his contract early, eventually leaving the club in June 2015. After leaving Gabala, Benga returned to Petrolul Ploiești, signing a three-year contract.

In January 2018, Benga joined Polish club Sandecja Nowy Sącz on a 6-month contract. He made his Ekstraklasa debut in 0–0 draw against Śląsk Wrocław on 3 March 2018. After Sandecja's relegation by the end of 2017–18 season, he left the club.

On 3 July 2018, Benga signed with Bulgarian club Septemvri Sofia.

Career statistics

Honours
Petrolul Ploiești
Liga II: 2010–11

Oțelul Galați
Supercupa României: 2011

Botev Plovdiv
 Bulgarian Cup runner-up: 2014

References

External links

1989 births
Living people
Romanian footballers
Romania youth international footballers
Association football defenders
Liga I players
Liga II players
First Professional Football League (Bulgaria) players
Azerbaijan Premier League players
Cypriot First Division players
Ekstraklasa players
FC Brașov (1936) players
FC Petrolul Ploiești players
ASC Oțelul Galați players
Botev Plovdiv players
Gabala FC players
Ermis Aradippou FC players
ASC Daco-Getica București players
Sandecja Nowy Sącz players
FC Septemvri Sofia players
AFC Chindia Târgoviște players
FC UTA Arad players
Romanian expatriate footballers
Romanian expatriate sportspeople in Bulgaria
Expatriate footballers in Bulgaria
Romanian expatriate sportspeople in Azerbaijan
Expatriate footballers in Azerbaijan
Romanian expatriate sportspeople in Cyprus
Expatriate footballers in Cyprus
Romanian expatriate sportspeople in Poland
Expatriate footballers in Poland
Sportspeople from Brașov